Picon Punch, or simply Picon, is a  highball cocktail made with an  Amaro liqueur, soda water, grenadine, a splash of lemon, and a bit of brandy floating on top. The drink is identified as Basque, but was created by Basque immigrants in the U.S. and taken back to the Basque region in the Pyrenees. It is popular in Basque restaurants and bars in Boise and southern Idaho, in Bakersfield and rural Northern and Central California, and in Reno throughout Northern Nevada.

The traditional liqueur used (Amer Picon) is made in Marseille, France, and is not readily available in the United States, so Torani Amer has come to be the standard liqueur used. Amaro CioCiaro is another acceptable liqueur that can be substituted.

In Northern Nevada, the Picon Punch is served with ice in a custom stemmed glass produced by the Louie Picon Glass Company of Sparks, Nevada.  In other regions, the drink is made in a highball or Collins glass filled with ice.

See also

 List of cocktails

References

Further reading

External links
 
 
 
 

Cocktails with liqueur